Frenzy was the fourth album by the group High Inergy. It was released on Motown's Gordy Label.

Track listing

"Skate To The Rhythm"	(4:03)
"Main Ingredient" 	(3:43)
"I Love Makin' Love (To The Music)" 	(3:54)
"Will We Ever Love Again?" 	(3:27)
"Phantom" 	(3:33)
"Heartbeat" 	(4:19)
"Somebody, Somewhere" 	(4:31)
"Voulez-vous?" 	(4:31)
"Time Of Your Life" 	(4:40)

References

1979 albums
Motown albums
High Inergy albums
Albums recorded at Total Experience Recording Studios